Ectypia clio, the Clio moth or Clio tiger moth, is a moth of the family Erebidae. It was described by Packard in 1864. It is found in  California and from south-western to western Nebraska and Texas. It is also found in Arizona, Utah, New Mexico and Colorado. The habitat consists of lowland areas, where it is found along creeks and rivers and in agricultural and urban areas.

The length of the forewings is 15–20 mm. Adults are white with some longitudinal black veins on the forewings. The hindwings are white or white with small black dots on the veins at the wing margin. Adults are on wing from late spring to early August.

The larvae feed on Asclepias species. They are black and covered with hairs.

Subspecies
Ectypia clio clio
Ectypia clio jessica (Barnes, 1900)

References

Phaegopterina
Moths described in 1864